Bargon is a village in West Champaran district in the Indian state of Bihar.

Demographics
 India census, Bargon had a population of 1008 in 212 households. Males constitute 51.19% of the population and females 48.8%. Bargon has an average literacy rate of 37.9%, lower than the national average of 74%: male literacy is 53%, and female literacy is 47%. In Bargon, 20% of the population is under 6 years of age.

References

Villages in West Champaran district